All for the Winner is a 1990 Hong Kong comedy film, directed by Jeffrey Lau and Corey Yuen, and starring Stephen Chow. First Movie to ever cross the HK$40 million(HK$41,326,156.00) mark in Hong Kong box office. It was a parody of God of Gamblers (1989), and due to its success it spawned a sequel, God of Gamblers II (1990), which featured characters from the original God of Gamblers.

Plot
Sing (Stephen Chow) is a mainland China country boy who arrives in Hong Kong to visit his Uncle "Blackie Tat" (Ng Man-tat). When Sing stays with his uncle and his friends in their apartment, Blackie soon learns of Sing's supernatural ability to see through objects and, later on, his ability to change playing cards by rubbing them. He takes advantage of this and turns Sing into the Dou Seng or the "Saint of Gamblers". After getting into a fight with several alleyway gamblers he meets the lovely Yee-mung a.k.a. "Lady Dream" (lit. trans: Beautiful Dream, but euphemistically as wet dream), a henchman for the "King of Gamblers", and becomes infatuated with her. Sing quickly becomes a rival to the King and must win his way through a world competition to prove his skill.

Cast
 Stephen Chow as (左頌星) Sing "Saint of Gamblers"
 Ng Man-tat as (黑仔達) Blackie Tat
 Sharla Cheung as (綺夢) Yee-mung "Lady Dream"
 Sandra Ng as (阿萍) Ping
 Paul Chun as (洪光) Mr. Hung "King of Gamblers"
 Corey Yuen as (賣魚盛) Fishy Shing
 Jeffrey Lau as (陳松) Chung Chan
 Wan Yeung-ming as Billy
 Sheila Chan as (阿英) Ying
 Chin Tsi-ang
 Angelina Lo as (六姑) Luk
 Cheung Ka-sang
 Liu Huang-hsi

Award nominations

References

External links
 
 All for the Winner at Hong Kong Cinemagic
 All for the Winner at chinesemov.com
 All for the Winner at LoveHKFilm
 
 

Hong Kong New Wave films
1990s Cantonese-language films
1990 films
1990 action comedy films
Hong Kong action comedy films
Hong Kong slapstick comedy films
1990s parody films
Films about gambling
Golden Harvest films
Films directed by Jeffrey Lau
Films directed by Corey Yuen
Films set in Hong Kong
Films shot in Hong Kong
1990s Hong Kong films